The Open Door is a 2016 Spanish tragicomedy film written and directed by Marina Seresesky which stars Carmen Machi, Terele Pávez and Asier Etxeandia.

Plot 
Rosa (a prostitute), lives with her mother (a former prostitute which whom she does not get along) in a flat in Madrid. They are torn about adopting the daughter of another prostitute who died because of an overdose.

Cast

Production 
Written and directed by Marina Seresesky, The Open Door is her feature film's directorial debut. The film was produced by Meridional Producciones and Chester Media Producciones alongside Stop&Play, Babilonia Films and MilCiclos, with the participation of Telemadrid.

Release 
Prior to its theatrical release, the film screened at the Guadalajara Film Festival (FICG), the Sofia International Film Festival (SIFF) and the Transilvania International Film Festival (TIFF), among others. Distributed by Pirámide Films, The Open Door was theatrically released in Spain on 2 September 2016.

Reception 
Reviewing for The Hollywood Reporter, Jonathan Holland deemed the film to be "an admirably abrasive by-women-for-women drama that works just fine until it starts to pull its punches later on".

Pere Vall of Fotogramas gave the film 3 out of 5 stars, writing about the talented and (carefully directed) cast.

Quim Casas of El Periódico de Catalunya gave the film 2 out of 5 stars, considering that, good intentions notwithstanding, it belongs to a type of cinema that is already outdated, "solidarity between people on the edge (hookers, transvestites, drug addicts) and very little else".

Sergio F. Pinilla of Cinemanía gave it 3 out of 5 stars, noting an evolution from previous shorts films by Seresesky, who is right on betting on a less neutral than voyeuristic point of view.

Awards and nominations 

|-
| align = "center" rowspan = "13" | 2017 || 22nd Forqué Awards || Best Actress || Carmen Machi ||  || 
|-
| rowspan = "3" | 4th Feroz Awards || colspan = "2" | Best Comedy Film ||  || rowspan = "3" | 
|-
| Best Actress (film) || Carmen Machi || 
|-
| Best Supporting Actress (film) || Terele Pávez || 
|-
| rowspan = "3" | 72nd CEC Medals || Best New Director || Marina Seresesky ||  || rowspan = "3" | 
|-
| Best Actress || Carmen Machi || 
|-
| Best Supporting Actress || Terele Pávez || 
|-
| rowspan = "2" | 31st Goya Awards || Best Actress || Carmen Machi ||  || rowspan = "2" |  
|-
| Best Supporting Actress || Terele Pávez || 
|-
| 67th Fotogramas de Plata || Best Film Actress || Carmen Machi ||  || 
|-
| rowspan = "3" | 26th Actors and Actresses Union Awards || Best Film Actress in a Leading Role || Carmen Machi ||  || rowspan = "3" | 
|-
| Best Film Actress in a Secondary Role || Terele Pávez || 
|-
| Best Film Actor in a Secondary Role || Asier Etxeandia || 
|}

See also 
 List of Spanish films of 2016

References

External links 
 La puerta abierta at ICAA's Catálogo de Cinespañol

2016 films
Spanish comedy-drama films
Tragicomedy films
Films about prostitution
Films shot in Madrid
2010s Spanish-language films
Films set in Madrid
2010s Spanish films